Khalilabad (also Romanized as Khalīlābād; also known as Shāh Bolāgh) is a village in Barf Anbar Rural District, in the Central District of Fereydunshahr County, Isfahan Province, Iran. At the 2006 census, its population was 379, in 84 families.

References 

Populated places in Fereydunshahr County